Amegilla confusa, is a species of bee belonging to the family Apidae subfamily Apinae.

References

External links
 http://animaldiversity.org/accounts/Amegilla_confusa/classification/
 https://www.itis.gov/servlet/SingleRpt/SingleRpt?search_topic=TSN&search_value=762613

Apinae
Insects described in 1854